The Bears–Packers rivalry is a National Football League (NFL) rivalry between the Chicago Bears and the Green Bay Packers. The two teams have a combined 67 members in the Pro Football Hall of Fame (34 for Chicago and 33 for Green Bay), have won a combined 22 NFL championships (13 for Green Bay and 9 for Chicago, first and second place among all NFL teams), and includes five Super Bowl championships (four for Green Bay and one for Chicago). They hold the top two spots for most wins all-time; the Bears had the record since 1921, but the Packers took over the record in a game against Chicago during the 2022 season, which both teams were tied at 786 wins going into. 

They are two of the oldest teams in the NFL. The Bears were founded as the Decatur Staleys, a works team of the A. E. Staley Manufacturing Company, in 1919; they turned professional in 1920 and joined the American Professional Football Association (APFA), forerunner of the NFL, as a charter member later that same year, then moved to Chicago in 1921 and becoming the Bears in 1922. The Packers were founded in 1919 and joined the APFA in 1921. The Packers currently have the most wins in NFL history.

It has been renewed annually in all but two seasons since 1921. They were not scheduled to play each other in 1922 and both meetings were canceled in 1982 due to the NFLPA strike, making the Lions–Packers rivalry the longest continuous rivalry in the NFL (the Packers and Detroit Lions have played each other at least twice a season since 1932).

The Packers and Bears have played in the same conference or division since the NFL went to a conference format in 1933. They played in the NFL's Western Conference from 1933 to 1970, and have been in the NFC North since 1970 (known as the NFC Central from 1970 to 2001). As such, they have usually played each other twice every regular season since 1933, except for the 1982 strike. The Bears-Packers rivalry is the most historic NFC North rivalry. The Bears held the winning record against the Packers for many decades, at one point, having led the series by as many as 24 games (in 1960 and again in 1992). The Packers surpassed the Bears in 2017 and now lead the series, 105–95–6. The Bears and Packers have met twice in the NFL playoffs (1941 and 2011), with each team winning once - the Bears winning in 1941 and the Packers winning in 2011.

Notable games and moments

1920s–1950s
Staleys 20, Packers 0 (November 27, 1921) – The two organizations played for the first time in 1921 at Chicago, when the Bears were nicknamed the Chicago Staleys. Bears' Gaylord "Pete" Stinchcomb scored the game's first touchdown on a 45-yard run. The Bears shut out the Packers 20–0 in their first meeting, and the rivalry was born. A year later, the Staleys changed their team name to the Bears.
Bears 3, Packers 0 (November 23, 1924) – The Bears–Packers rivalry can be credited for the first ever ejection of players for fighting during an NFL game. The Bears' Frank Hanny and Packers' Tillie Voss were ejected before the end of the first half as verbal exchanges led to punches being thrown. Two years later, Hanny was ejected once again in a game versus Green Bay.
Packers 7, Bears 0 (September 28, 1930) – The Packers shut out the Bears for the fifth consecutive game in this contest which is the longest such streak in the series. The streak began in 1928 when the Packers defeated the Bears 6–0 on December 9 of that season. In 1929, the Packers shut out the Bears three times, 23–0, 14–0, and 25–0 en route to their first NFL championship. On November 9, the Bears finally scored on the Packers although they came up short in the final score 13–12. The Packers then went on to win their second consecutive NFL title that season.
Packers 7, Bears 0 (September 22, 1935) – On the first play of the game, rookie receiver Don Hutson scored on an 83-yard touchdown pass from Arnie Herber for the only score of the game. This was Hutson's first career reception and touchdown in what would become a historic Hall of Fame career.
Bears 30, Packers 3 (September 20, 1936) – During a dominant Bears victory, Packers fan Emmett Platten, out of frustration, ran out onto the field and punched Bears lineman Ted Rosequist, believing Rosequist had committed several dirty plays on the Packers. Rosequist was knocked out by the punch and had to be removed from the game. 
Packers 16, Bears 14 (November 2, 1941) – The Bears came into the game undefeated and seemingly invincible. Over their first five games, they defeated their rivals by an unprecedented 157 points. However, the Packers upset them in this game which was the Bears lone defeat that season. The Associated Press wrote of the game that the "Chicago Bears myth is broken". Chicago fans made accusations that the game had been fixed, and it was suggested that the Packers had employed a "secret" defensive scheme. The Packers had built a 16–0 lead through the first three quarters of play before the Bears mounted a comeback in the fourth quarter coming up just short of a win.
Bears 33, Packers 14 (December 14, 1941) – In the first playoff meeting between the two rivals, the Bears defeated the Packers 33–14 in a one-game-playoff to determine the Western Division championship. After the Packers, the Bears defeated the New York Giants en route to their fourth NFL Championship. Until the 2010 post-season, this remained the only playoff meeting between the teams.
Bears 52, Packers 31 (November 6, 1955) – The Bears and Packers played the highest-scoring game of their series at Soldier Field in the 1955 season. The Bears created a huge 45–3 lead, but the Packers were able to score 28 points in the fourth quarter; by the game's end, the Bears beat the Packers 52–31, with the two teams combining for 83 points. This was also the last game that George Halas coached the Bears in against the Packers until 1958 due to a temporary break from coaching.
Packers 21, Bears 17 (September 29, 1957) – The Packers hosted the Bears in the inaugural game of their brand new stadium, initially called New City Stadium (later changed to Lambeau Field in 1965). Among the attendees to the game included NFL Commissioner Bert Bell, United States Vice President Richard Nixon, actor James Arness, and Miss America 1958, Marilyn Van Derbur. Playing behind several times during the game, the Packers finally were able to gain the lead in the 4th quarter on a 6-yard touchdown pass from Babe Parilli to Gary Knafelc for the winning points.
Packers 9, Bears 6 (September 27, 1959) – In the debut game of new Packers head coach, Vince Lombardi, the Packers fell behind the Bears 6–0, until Jim Taylor scored on a 5-yard touchdown run, giving the Packers the lead. Dave Hanner followed the touchdown with a safety, sacking Bears quarterback Ed Brown in the Bears' endzone to cap off the victory. The Packers celebrated their first win under their new coach by carrying him on their shoulders after the game.

1960s–1970s
Packers 31, Bears 28 (November 12, 1961) – The Packers built up an impressive 31–7 lead in the game, but the Bears made a furious comeback with three unanswered touchdowns to make the score 31–28. Still, the Packers were able to win the game; they would go on to win the NFL Championship that year against the New York Giants.
Packers 49, Bears 0 (September 30, 1962) – Vince Lombardi's Packers shutout George Halas' Bears, 49–0 at City Stadium, the Packers largest margin of victory in the rivalry. The team repeated that score against the Philadelphia Eagles six weeks later on Nov 11, 1962. The games remain a Packers team record for most points in a shutout victory. After again defeating the Bears later in the season, this time by a score of 38–7, the Packers won their 8th NFL championship. Motivated by the two humiliating losses to the Packers, Halas spent the off-season focusing on beating the Packers.
Bears 26, Packers 7 (November 17, 1963) – The Bears and Packers, both with 8–1 records, met at Wrigley Field to play for first place in the Western Conference. Chicago, behind a dominant defense, got a 26–0 lead and held on to win 26–7, completing a sweep of the Packers in the 1963 season and handling Green Bay only two losses of the season. The Bears finished the season with an NFL championship victory over the New York Giants once again, claiming their 8th NFL Championship.
Packers 23, Bears 12 (September 13, 1964) – Remembered as the "Free Kick Game" because the Packers invoked the surprising "Fair catch kick rule", which allows for a place or drop kick field goal attempt from the spot of a fair catch. Elijah Pitts fair caught a Bears punt on the Bears' 48-yard-line just before the end of the first half. Packers' coach Vince Lombardi opted to attempt a free kick. Confusion ensued as neither team had ever so much as even practiced a free kick. The Packers lined up at the line of scrimmage with Bart Starr holding for Paul Hornung. Hornung made the 52-yard field goal as the first half ended. The Packers stunned all in attendance with the kick, and won the game 23–12.
Bears 13, Packers 10 (November 3, 1968) – The Bears got their revenge on the Packers, beating them 13–10 on a fair catch free kick by Mac Percival at the 43-yard line after a Packers punt with :26 left in the game. Percival kicked a game-winner the week before against the Minnesota Vikings.

1980s
Packers 12, Bears 6 (September 7, 1980) – With the score tied 6–6 and the game in overtime, Packers kicker Chester Marcol was called in to attempt a game-winning field goal. The Bears' Alan Page managed to break through and block the field goal, with the football hitting his helmet. The ball rebounded to Marcol, and, carrying the ball, he crossed the goal line to score the winning touchdown for the Packers. Marcol later acknowledged that he was high on cocaine during the game's second half.
Bears 61, Packers 7 (December 7, 1980) – In the game, the Bears scored eight offensive touchdowns. After the Packers had suffered the second-most lopsided defeat in their history, Bart Starr charged across the field to confront Bears coach Neill Armstrong. Starr was upset because Bears defensive coordinator Buddy Ryan had the Bears blitzing from all angles in the fourth quarter, even after the Packers inserted backup quarterback David Whitehurst with the score 48–7. "Bart Starr was upset," Armstrong said after the game. "He did the talking and I did the listening. He said he'd rather not hear what I had to say, something to that effect, and he left." Two years later, Bill Tobin, the Bears' vice president of player personnel at the time, revealed that he had been instructed by general manager Jim Finks during the off-season to study film and decode the Packers' signal system for relaying plays to the quarterback. Tobin, who had been in the Packers' front office during the Devine years, had been fired by Starr in 1975 as part of a wholesale housecleaning. "I went at it like a tiger does good meat," Tobin said at the time. "We wanted 100 points," defensive end Dan Hampton said. "It couldn't happen to a nicer bunch of pricks."
Bears 23, Packers 7 (October 21, 1985) – The world was introduced to rookie defensive lineman William "The Refrigerator" Perry on Monday Night Football. In goal line situations, Bears head coach Mike Ditka used Perry, who weighed roughly 300 lbs. in the fullback position. Twice, Perry led the way for Bears legend Walter Payton on two- and one-yard touchdown runs. In the second quarter, "the Fridge" was given the ball and plunged into the end zone for one of the heaviest touchdowns in NFL history. The Bears won 23–7, and "The Fridge" was born.
Bears 16, Packers 10 (November 10, 1985) – Before the game, the Packers placed horse manure in the Bears locker room. Two weeks after the Monday Night Game, tempers reached a boiling point in the rivalry. Packers cornerback Mark Lee was ejected after he and Bears running back Walter Payton went flying over a bench in the first quarter. A few minutes later, Packers safety Ken Stills was flagged for hitting Matt Suhey of the Bears well after the whistle. The very next month, the Bears would release their song The Super Bowl Shuffle (two months before they won the Super Bowl), making them the only team of any professional sport to record a US Hot 100 hit and receive a Grammy nomination.
Bears 12, Packers 10 (November 23, 1986) – In Week 12 of the 1986 season Green Bay defensive tackle Charles Martin wore a towel with a hit list of specific Bears numbers written on it, such as No. 34 Walter Payton, No. 9 Jim McMahon, and others. Following a McMahon interception Martin came up from behind and body slammed him to the turf purposely well after the whistle separating McMahon's shoulder and ending the quarterback's season. Martin was suspended for two games, at the time the longest suspension in NFL history.
Packers 14, Bears 13 (November 6, 1989) – This became known as the Instant Replay Game. Packers quarterback Don Majkowski led the Packers to a comeback with an apparent game-winning touchdown pass to wide receiver Sterling Sharpe. The play was called a touchdown, but line judge Jim Quirk had called a penalty on Majkowski for being beyond the line of scrimmage when he threw the pass. A nervous and tense crowd at Lambeau Field waited as the call went up to the instant replay official. Several minutes later, the call came down and the touchdown was awarded as recorded by instant replay, providing the Packers their first victory over the Bears since 1984. This led to a change in the "illegal forward pass" rule which defined when to consider a passer past the line of scrimmage. The rule used to be judged by the position of the ball instead of the passer's feet. Bears coach Mike Ditka ordered that an asterisk be placed next to the result in all team publications.

1990s

Packers 33, Bears 6 (October 31, 1994) – Playing with a severely bruised hip in a driving rainstorm at Soldier Field on Halloween Night, Brett Favre rushes for a career-high 58 yards – including a 36-yard touchdown in the second quarter when he leaped over a Bears defender. After the game Favre said "Maybe Gale Sayers (who had his number retired that night along with Dick Butkus) got excited about that one". With a win in that game, Green Bay began a ten-game winning streak against the Bears as Favre was considered a "Bear-killer" by members of the Chicago Bears media and fans alike. This game marked the beginning of two streaks in the series. The Packers won ten consecutive games in the series (the longest between the two clubs) and also eleven consecutive away games – a streak that did not end until the 2005 season. Throwback uniforms were worn by both teams.
Packers 27, Bears 24 (September 11, 1995) – Packers QB Brett Favre throws a 99-yard touchdown pass to Robert Brooks – one of only 13 times in NFL history a 99-yard TD pass has ever been completed. Green Bay stormed to a 27–7 lead and had 431 yards on offense compared to Chicago's 243, Although Chicago scored 17 unanswered at the end, they came up just short as time expired. The game was featured nationally on Monday Night Football.
Packers 35, Bears 28 (November 12, 1995) – Coming into this much-anticipated matchup, first place in the NFC Central division was on the line. A victory would give the Packers the same record as the Bears (6–4) and would mean a series sweep, giving Green Bay the head-to-head tie-breaker should the teams be tied at season's end. Brett Favre had a badly sprained ankle, which kept his status for the game uncertain. Not only did Favre start, but he had his best game of the season up to that point. He completed 25 of 33 passes for 336 yards and a career-high five touchdowns. Bears QB Erik Kramer also had a solid game, going 23 of 38 for 318 yards, two touchdowns, and one interception. The teams combined for 800 yards of offense. The game was not decided until Kramer threw an incomplete pass in the Packers' end zone on the final play of the game.
Packers 24, Bears 23 (October 12, 1997) – In one of the more back-and-forth contests in the rivalry, the Bears got off to a 10–0 lead thanks in part to a rushing touchdown by Raymont Harris in the first quarter before the Packers came back to take a 14–10 halftime lead due to a rushing score by Dorsey Levens. In the third quarter, Erik Kramer ran for a three-yard touchdown to put the Bears back in front, 17–14. However, in the waning seconds of the third quarter, Brett Favre connected with Mark Chmura for a touchdown. The Packers led, 21–17, then extended their lead to 24–17. The Bears marched down the field and scored when Kramer connected with Chris Penn with less than two minutes left. In an "all-or-nothing" maneuver, the Bears went for a two-point conversion. The pass fell incomplete, essentially preserving the win for the Packers.
Bears 14, Packers 13 (November 7, 1999) – The Bears defeated the Packers for the first time since 1993 on a blocked field goal by defensive tackle Bryan Robinson and was the first game in the series played after the death of Walter Payton. This was also the game in which Brett Favre surpassed Ron Jaworski's record for most consecutive starts by a quarterback.

2000s
Packers 34, Bears 21 (October 7, 2002) – This Monday night contest at Memorial Stadium in Champaign, Illinois, was the only Bears home game in the entire series that was played outside of Chicago. Brett Favre threw an 85-yard TD pass to Driver in the first quarter—the second longest of his career to that point (both against the Bears). At the time, Soldier Field was undergoing a major renovation; the renovated stadium would later reopen in 2003 between the Bears and Packers.
Bears 26, Packers 0 (September 10, 2006) – In the opening week of the season, the Bears handed Brett Favre his first shutout in his 16-year career, winning 26–0 in Green Bay. The Bears' offense, criticized for being conservative, opened the game with a 49-yard touchdown pass from Rex Grossman to Bernard Berrian. This also marked the first game in which the Bears' Devin Hester returned a punt for a touchdown.
Bears 20, Packers 17 (December 22, 2008) – The coldest game in recorded Bears history featured a temperature at kickoff of 2 degrees and −13 degrees with wind chill. The Packers traveled to Soldier Field on a Monday night, where a victory against the Bears would have ended their playoff hopes. The Bears had to rally from a 14–3 score at the half. The Bears were able to score after a turnover on a Packers punt return. The Packers were on the verge of finishing a game-winning drive when Mason Crosby's field goal attempt was blocked by Alex Brown, pushing the game to overtime. The Bears took the first possession in overtime and won the game on a 38-yard field goal by Robbie Gould.

2010s
Bears 20, Packers 17 (September 27, 2010) – The 2–0 Packers traveled to Chicago for an early season showdown with the 2–0 Bears for the NFC North lead. Aaron Rodgers threw a 7-yard touchdown pass to Greg Jennings to open the scoring in the first quarter. Mason Crosby made it 10–0 with 4:45 left in the second quarter, but Jay Cutler drove the Bears down and connected with Greg Olsen for a touchdown with 31 seconds left. Late in the 3rd quarter, Julius Peppers blocked a 37-yard field goal attempt by Mason Crosby to keep it 10–7 Packers. Devin Hester then opened the 4th quarter with a 62-yard punt return for a touchdown to make it 14–10 Bears. Aaron Rodgers led the Packers on a drive that resulted in him getting into the end zone on a 3-yard scamper to make it 17–14. However, the Packers were left to regret a sloppy performance, as they recorded a team record 18 penalties. The Bears took advantage, with Robbie Gould kicking a field goal with 4:03 left and then 0:08 left to claim a 20–17 victory. This would be the last time the Bears beat the Packers at Soldier Field until the 2018 season.
Packers 10, Bears 3 (January 2, 2011) – The 9–6 Packers hosted the 11–4 Bears in a must-win game in order to enter the playoffs. Even though the Bears had already locked up a bye and had nothing to play for, Coach Lovie Smith played all of his starters to try to prevent the Packers from making the playoffs. With both teams coming off of high scoring victories, a shoot-out was anticipated. However, the frozen tundra yielded a defensive battle, as the teams were tied 3–3 late in the fourth quarter. With 2:50 remaining, Aaron Rodgers hit tight end Donald Lee for a 1-yard touchdown pass to take a 10–3 lead.
Packers 21, Bears 14 (January 23, 2011, NFC Championship Game) – This was the first time the two teams had met in the playoffs since 1941. The Green Bay Packers started off strong with an early 14–0 lead on an Aaron Rodgers rushing TD. Bears' quarterback, Jay Cutler, was injured late in the second quarter, and was unable to continue. After Bears' quarterback Todd Collins proved ineffective, going 0 for 4 on two drives, the Bears brought in Caleb Hanie, who led them to a 1-yard touchdown run by Chester Taylor to make it 14–7. On the very next Bears drive, however, Hanie would be intercepted by B. J. Raji, who took it to the endzone to make it 21–7 late in the game. The Bears would answer with another TD. With one more drive to tie the game, Hanie threw his second interception, this time to Sam Shields to end the game and send Green Bay to the Super Bowl. The Packers went on to win Super Bowl XLV over the Pittsburgh Steelers, becoming the NFC's first sixth-seeded team (and second wild card team) to win the Super Bowl.
Bears 27, Packers 20 (November 4, 2013) – Heading into this Monday Night match-up at Lambeau Field, Bears' quarterback Jay Cutler was sidelined with a groin injury. Thus, backup quarterback Josh McCown played in Cutler's stead. In the first drive of the game, Packers' quarterback Aaron Rodgers was sacked by Shea McClellin, which fractured Rodgers' left collarbone and sent him out of the game. McCown threw for 272 yards and two touchdowns, and no interceptions. Packers backup quarterback Seneca Wallace threw for 114 yards and no touchdowns, with one interception. The Bears won the game 27–20 to end a six-game losing streak to the Packers. Aaron Rodgers would be out for 7 weeks, eventually returning in Week 17 against the Bears for the NFC North title.
Packers 33, Bears 28 (December 29, 2013) – In a game with the NFC North Championship on the line, the Packers faced off against the Bears. The game was notable for a Rodgers fumble to touchdown that occurred when most players from both teams believed the play to be an incomplete pass. The game also showcased an offensive shootout in the second half, including Bears quarterback Jay Cutler throwing for two touchdowns. However, the Packers ended their last drive converting on 4th down three times, most notably in a long 4th and 8 completion to Randall Cobb for a touchdown that would win the game and deliver Green Bay its 3rd consecutive NFC North title. The loss would keep the Bears out of the playoffs.
Packers 55, Bears 14 (November 6, 2014) – Aaron Rodgers tied an NFL record with 6 touchdown passes in the first half in a blowout win for the Packers, the most lopsided win for the Packers over the Bears since 1962 and their highest point total in a game since 1945. Bears' kickoff returner Chris Williams tied an NFL record with 10 kickoff returns in a game, one of which went for a 101-yard touchdown. 
Bears 17, Packers 13 (November 26, 2015) – On the night of Brett Favre's jersey retirement, the Bears met the Packers at Lambeau Field for a Thanksgiving match-up. With a 4–6 record and having lost to the Packers earlier in the year, Chicago entered the game as huge underdogs. While the Bears' offense stalled in the first quarter, the Packers took a 7-point lead on a touchdown pass from Aaron Rodgers to Eddie Lacy. In the second quarter, the Bears scored two touchdowns, while the Packers settled for two field goals, making the score 14–13 at halftime. The Bears scored one more field goal in the fourth quarter while their defense pitched a second half shutout, including a goal line stand in the game's final seconds.
Packers 30, Bears 27 (December 18, 2016) – With the Packers needing a win to move within a game of the NFC North lead, they entered Soldier Field during one of the coldest Chicago Bears games on record. Tied 10–10 at halftime, Green Bay surged to a 27–10 advantage in the third quarter, before the Bears made a run of their own in the fourth quarter to bring them within 3 points and in striking distance of the Green Bay end zone. Green Bay held the Bears to a field goal after a goal-line stand. During the Packers' ensuing possession, quarterback Aaron Rodgers completed a 60-yard pass to Jordy Nelson which led to a Packers field goal as time expired.
Packers 24, Bears 23 (September 9, 2018) – After an off-season in which both teams made massive player acquisitions, most notably the Bears having acquired linebacker Khalil Mack, the two teams met on Sunday Night Football for a highly anticipated Week 1 matchup. The Bears struck first with a 2-yard touchdown run by quarterback Mitchell Trubisky. After the two teams exchanged three and outs, Chicago ended the 1st quarter up 7–0. The Bears would later add to the lead with a Cody Parkey field goal to make it 10–0. Late in the second quarter, defensive lineman Roy Robertson-Harris knocked Aaron Rodgers out with a knee injury and the Bears capitalized with Mack getting a pick-six off Packers backup DeShone Kizer. Rodgers would return to the game in third quarter down 20–0, and led the Packers on a scoring drive culminating in a Mason Crosby field goal to end the third quarter with the Bears leading 20–3. However, the Packers outscored the Bears 21–3 off three Rodgers touchdown passes, to take a 24–23 lead with just over 2 minutes left. The Packers would hang on to win by that score. The 17-point fourth-quarter comeback for the Packers represented their largest in franchise history. However, the teams would head in opposite directions going forward.
Bears 24, Packers 17 (December 16, 2018) – Following their Week 1 meeting, the Bears and Packers had gone in opposite directions during the 2018 season. The 5-7-1 Packers and 9-4 Bears met in Soldier Field for a Week 15 showdown with major implications in the playoff race for both teams. The Bears needed a win to clinch the NFC North, while a Packers victory would keep their slim playoff hopes alive. Led by a dominant defensive performance and two touchdown passes from Mitchell Trubisky, the Bears would win the game 24-17 (their first win over the Packers at Soldier Field since 2010) and clinched the NFC North while eliminating the Packers from playoff contention. Linebacker Khalil Mack would sack Aaron Rodgers 2.5 times while safety Eddie Jackson intercepted Rodgers late in the fourth quarter to seal the Bears victory (and also breaking Rodgers' NFL-record streak of 402 consecutive passes without an interception). The Packers would finish the season 6-9-1 (their first time since 1990–91 with back-to-back losing seasons) while the Bears would finish 12–4, losing in the Wild Card round to the Eagles in the Double Doink Game.
Packers 10, Bears 3 (September 5, 2019) – 2019 was the NFL's 100th season. It was also the Chicago Bears' 100th season in the NFL. The NFL decided to pay tribute to its 100th season by deciding the match up of the first game of their season on Thursday with the NFL's longest rivalry the Packers and the Bears at Soldier Field. The decision would break the NFL's yearly tradition of their first game being the defending Super Bowl champions at their home field which would've been the New England Patriots at Gillette Stadium since the Patriots won Super Bowl LIII the previous year. The Bears' only points in the game would be a field goal in the 1st quarter while the Packers scored a touchdown in the 2nd quarter and a field goal in the fourth quarter as the Packers won the game 10–3. The game was officially sealed when two newly signed Packers free agents, safety Adrian Amos and linebacker Preston Smith made plays that ended the Bears' final two offensive drives. 
Packers 21, Bears 13 (December 15, 2019) – The Bears and Packers would meet at Lambeau Field in a Week 15 matchup that, like the 2018 matchup, would have major playoff implications for both teams. The Packers needed a win to keep their hopes for an NFC North title alive, while the Bears needed a win plus a Vikings loss to stay alive in the playoff hunt. After the Packers raced to a 21–3 lead in the third quarter, the Bears would score 10 unanswered points in the fourth quarter to cut the lead to 21–13. It took until the game's final play to seal the game, as the final play of the game was a botched lateral by the Bears that was recovered by the Packers' Tramon Williams. In a role reversal of 2018, the Packers eliminated the Bears from playoff contention with the win and clinched the NFC North a week later with a Monday Night win at the Vikings. The Packers would finish the season 13–3, falling to the 49ers in the NFC Championship Game, while the Bears finished the season 8-8.

2020s
Packers 35, Bears 16 (January 3, 2021) – The Packers defeated the Bears in the final game of the season to clinch the NFC's #1 seed.  The Bears could have clinched the NFC's #7 seed and final playoff berth with a win, but were able to get into the playoffs anyway thanks to an Arizona Cardinals loss later that day.
Packers 28, Bears 19 (December 4, 2022) – Both teams entered this game tied with the most wins all-time at 786. The Packers came away with a victory to take the all-time wins record from the Bears, who had held it since 1921.

Playoffs
The Bears and Packers have made it to the playoffs in the same year five times:

1941 The Bears and Packers finished with identical 10–1 records (splitting the two games with each other and winning all of their remaining games) to finish tied atop the NFL Western Division. At the time, only the two division champions would make it to the post-season but ties were broken with a playoff game. The Bears would win the playoff game 33–14 and go on to win the NFL Championship. The teams would not meet in the playoffs again until the 2010 NFC Championship Game.
1994 Both teams entered the playoffs as Wild Card teams and won their respective first-round games. They would each lose in the second round – Green Bay to the Dallas Cowboys and Chicago to the San Francisco 49ers. 
2001 The Bears won the NFC Central division and clinched a first round bye. The Packers were a Wild Card team and defeated the San Francisco 49ers in the first round. Both teams would lose in the second round – Green Bay to the St. Louis Rams and Chicago to the Philadelphia Eagles.
2010 The two teams met on the last day of the season in what was a must-win for Green Bay. The Packers won 10–3 to clinch the 6-seed, while the Bears had already secured a first-round bye as the 2-seed. Green Bay defeated the Philadelphia Eagles and Atlanta Falcons, while Chicago defeated the Seattle Seahawks to set up the rivals' second postseason meeting in the NFC Championship Game. Many fans of both teams describe the game as the biggest in the history of the rivalry, with a trip to the Super Bowl on the line. The Packers would ultimately prevail 21–14 and go on to beat the Pittsburgh Steelers in Super Bowl XLV.
2020 The two teams met on the last day of the regular season in Chicago with the Packers able to clinch the NFC's #1 seed with a win and the Bears able to clinch a playoff berth with a win. The Packers won the game 35–16, but the Bears were able to clinch the #7 seed thanks to an Arizona Cardinals loss to the Los Angeles Rams. The Bears lost to the New Orleans Saints in the first round. Had the Bears won, they would have played the Packers in the second round. The Packers made it to the NFC Championship Game, which they lost to the eventual Super Bowl LV champion Tampa Bay Buccaneers.

Statistics and records
As of December 4, 2022 there have been 206 games between the two teams—most in NFL history—since their first league game in 1921, of which Green Bay has won 105 games, Chicago 95, and there have been 6 ties. The largest margin of victory was a 61–7 Bears win in 1980. The longest winning streak is held by the Packers at 10 games from 1994 to 1998. After beating the Bears four times in 2011, the Packers became only the second team in NFL history to defeat the same opponent four times in one calendar year (the Los Angeles Raiders defeated the Denver Broncos four times in 1994).

Club success
As of 2020, the Bears and Packers have won a combined 22 championships in the league's history.

 Table correct through Week 17 of the 2020 season.

Game results

|-
| 1921
| style="| 
| style="| Staleys  20–0
| no game
| Bears  1–0
| Packers join the APFA. Staleys win 1921 APFA Championship. 
|-
| 
| style="| 
| no game
| style="| Bears 3–0
| Bears  2–0
|
|-
| 
| style="| 
| style="| Bears  3–0
| no game
| Bears  3–0
|
|-
| 
| Tie 1–1
| style="| Bears  21–0
| style="| Packers  14–10
| Bears  4–1
| 
|-
|rowspan="2"| 
|rowspan="2" style="| 
| style="| Bears  19–13
|rowspan="2"| Tie  6–6
|rowspan="2"| Bears  5–1–2
|rowspan="2"| 
|-
| Tie  3–3
|-
| 
| style="| 
| style="| Bears  14–6
| style="| Bears  7–6
| Bears  7–1–2
| 
|-
|rowspan="2"| 
|rowspan="2" style="| 
| style="| Packers  16–6
|rowspan="2"| Tie  12–12
|rowspan="2"| Bears  7–3–3
|rowspan="2"| 
|-
| style="| Packers  6–0
|-
|rowspan="2"| 
|rowspan="2" style="| 
| style="| Packers  14–0
|rowspan="2" style="| Packers  23–0
|rowspan="2"| Bears  7–6–3
|rowspan="2"| Packers win 1929 NFL Championship.
|-
| style="| Packers  25–0
|-

|-
|rowspan="2"| 
|rowspan="2" style="| 
| style="| Packers  13–12
|rowspan="2" style="| Packers  7–0
|rowspan="2"| Tie  8–8–3
|rowspan="2"| Packers win 1930 NFL Championship.
|-
| style="| Bears  21–0
|-
|rowspan="2"| 
|rowspan="2" style="| 
| style="| Packers  6–2
|rowspan="2" style="| Packers  7–0
|rowspan="2"| Packers  10–9–3
|rowspan="2"| Packers win 1931 NFL Championship.
|-
| style="| Bears  7–6
|-
|rowspan="2"| 
|rowspan="2"| Tie 1–1–1
|style="| Packers  2–0
|rowspan="2"| Tie  0–0
|rowspan="2"| Packers  11–10–4
|rowspan="2"| Bears win 1932 NFL Championship.
|-
| style="| Bears  9–0
|-
|rowspan="2"| 
|rowspan="2" style="| 
| style="| Bears 10–7
|rowspan="2" style="| Bears 14–7
|rowspan="2"| Bears  13–11–4
|rowspan="2"| Would be the last time both teams would meet three times during the regular season. Bears win 1933 NFL Championship.
|-
| style="| Bears  7–6
|-
| 
| style="| 
| style="| Bears  27–14
| style="| Bears  24–10
| Bears  15–11–4
| Bears lose 1934 NFL Championship.
|-
| 
| style="| 
| style="| Packers  17–14
| style="| Packers  7–0
| Bears  15–13–4
| 
|-
| 
| Tie 1–1
| style="| Packers  21–10
| style="| Bears  30–3
| Bears  16–14–4
| Packers win 1936 NFL Championship.
|-
| 
| Tie 1–1
| style="| Packers  24–14
| style="| Bears  14–2
| Bears  17–15–4
| Bears lose 1937 NFL Championship.
|-
| 
| Tie 1–1
| style="| Packers  24–17
| style="| Bears  2–0
| Bears  18–16–4
| Packers lose 1938 NFL Championship.
|-
| 
| Tie 1–1
| style="| Bears  30–27
| style="| Packers  21–16
| Bears  19–17–4
| Packers win 1939 NFL Championship.
|-

|-
| 
| style="| 
| style="| Bears  14–7
| style="| Bears  41–10
| Bears  21–17–4
| Bears win 1940 NFL Championship.
|-
| 
| Tie 1–1
| style="| Packers  16–14
| style="| Bears  25–17
| Bears  22–18–4
| Both teams went 10–1 on the season, with their only losses coming to each other. Bears win 1941 NFL Championship.
|- style="font-weight:bold;background:#f2f2f2;"
| 1941 Playoffs
| style="| 
| style="| Bears  33–14
|
| Bears  23–18–4
| NFL Western Division playoff, required as the teams were tied atop the division. First postseason meeting in the rivalry.
|-
| 
| style="| 
| style="| Bears  44–28
| style="| Bears  38–7
| Bears  25–18–4
| 
|-
| 
| style="| 
| style="| Bears  21–7
| Tie  21–21
| Bears  26–18–5
| Bears win 1943 NFL Championship.
|-
| 
| Tie 1–1
| style="| Bears  21–0
| style="| Packers  42–28
| Bears  27–19–5
| Packers win 1944 NFL Championship.
|-
| 
| Tie 1–1
| style="| Bears  28–24
| style="| Packers  31–21
| Bears  28–20–5
| 
|-
| 
| style="| 
| style="| Bears  10–7
| style="| Bears  30–7
| Bears  30–20–5
| Bears win 1946 NFL Championship.
|-
| 
| Tie 1–1
| style="| Bears  20–17
| style="| Packers  31–21
| Bears  31–21–5
| 
|-
| 
| style="| 
| style="| Bears  7–6
| style="| Bears  45–7
| Bears  33–21–5
| 
|-
| 
| style="| 
| style="| Bears  24–3
| style="| Bears  17–0
| Bears  35–21–5
| 
|-

|-
| 
| Tie 1–1
| style="| Bears  28–14
| style="| Packers  31–21
| Bears  36–22–5
| 
|-
| 
| style="| 
| style="| Bears  24–13
| style="| Bears  31–20
| Bears  38–22–5
| Bears win 11 straight meetings at home (1941–51).
|-
| 
| Tie 1–1
| style="| Packers  41–28
| style="| Bears  24–14
| Bears  39–23–5
| Lions win 1952 NFL Championship.
|-
| 
| style="| 
| Tie  21–21
| style="| Bears  17–23
| Bears  40–23–6
| Last tie between the two teams (as of December 4, 2022).
|-
| 
| style="| 
| style="| Bears  28–23
| style="| Bears  10–3
| Bears  42–23–6
| 
|-
| 
| Tie 1–1
| style="| Bears  52–31
| style="| Packers  24–3
| Bears  43–24–6
| Bears' 52–31 marks the highest-scoring game in the history of the rivalry (83 points).
|-
| 
| style="| 
| style="| Bears  38–14
| style="| Bears  37–21
| Bears  45–24–6
| Bears lose 1956 NFL Championship.
|-
| 
| Tie 1–1
| style="| Bears  21–14
| style="| Packers  21–17
| Bears  46–25–6
| Packers open Lambeau Field.
|-
| 
| style="| 
| style="| Bears  24–10
| style="| Bears  34–20
| Bears  48–25–6
| 
|-
| 
| Tie 1–1
| style="| Bears  28–17
| style="| Packers  9–6
| Bears  49–26–6
| 
|-

|-
| 
| Tie 1–1
| style="| Packers  41–13
| style="| Bears  17–14
| Bears  50–27–6
| Bears take a 24-game lead in the all-time series with the Packers after their season-opening win, the largest lead in the rivalry's history by either team. The Bears later matched their own record in 1992. Packers lose 1960 NFL Championship.
|-
| 
| style="| 
| style="| Packers  31–28
| style="| Packers  24–0
| Bears  50–29–6
| Packers' first season sweep since 1935. Packers win 1961 NFL Championship.
|-
| 
| style="| 
| style="| Packers  38–7
| style="| Packers  49–0
| Bears  50–31–6
| Packers' 49–0 win is their largest margin of victory over the Bears. Packers win 1962 NFL Championship.
|-
| 
| style="| 
| style="| Bears  26–7
| style="| Bears  10–3
| Bears  52–31–6
| Bears win 1963 NFL Championship.
|-
| 
| style="| 
| style="| Packers  17–3
| style="| Packers  23–12
| Bears  52–33–6
| 
|-
| 
| Tie 1–1
| style="| Bears  31–10
| style="| Packers  23–14
| Bears  53–34–6
| Packers win 1965 NFL Championship.
|-
| 
| style="| 
| style="| Packers  17–0
| style="| Packers  13–6
| Bears  53–36–6
| Packers win 1966 NFL Championship and Super Bowl I.
|-
| 
| style="| 
| style="| Packers  17–13
| style="| Packers  13–10
| Bears  53–38–6
| Packers win 1967 NFL Championship and Super Bowl II.
|-
| 
| Tie 1–1
| style="| Packers  28–27
| style="| Bears  13–10
| Bears  54–39–6
|
|-
| 
| style="| 
| style="| Packers  21–3
| style="| Packers  17–0
| Bears  54–41–6
| 
|-

|-
| 
| Tie 1–1
| style="| Bears  35–17
| style="| Packers  20–19
| Bears  55–42–6
| Both teams placed in the NFC Central after AFL-NFL merger.
|-
| 
| style="| 
| style="| Packers  17–14
| style="| Packers  31–10
| Bears  55–44–6
| Bears open Soldier Field. 
|-
| 
| style="| 
| style="| Packers  23–17
| style="| Packers  20–17
| Bears  55–46–6
| 
|-
| 
| Tie 1–1
| style="| Packers  21–0
| style="| Bears  31–17
| Bears  56–47–6 
| 
|-
| 
| Tie 1–1
| style="| Bears  10–3
| style="| Packers  10–9
| Bears  57–48–6 
| Packers' home game played at Milwaukee County Stadium. While the Packers have played a few home games per year in Milwaukee from 1932 to 1994, this was the only Bears–Packers regular season game to take place in Milwaukee.
|-
| 
| Tie 1–1
| style="| Bears  27–14
| style="| Packers  28–7
| Bears  58–49–6 
| 
|-
| 
| style="| 
| style="| Bears  24–13
| style="| Bears  16–10
| Bears  60–49–6
|
|-
| 
| style="| 
| style="| Bears  26–0
| style="| Bears  28–10
| Bears  62–49–6
| 
|-
| 
| Tie 1–1
| style="| Bears  24–0
| style="| Packers  24–14
| Bears  63–50–6 
| 
|-
| 
| style="| 
| style="| Bears  6–3
| style="| Bears  15–14
| Bears  65–50–6
| 
|-

|-
| 
| Tie 1–1
| style="| Bears  61–7
| style="| Packers  12–6(OT)
| Bears  66–51–6
| Bears' 61–7 win is the largest margin of victory in the series. Packers win game in Green Bay on a blocked field goal returned for a touchdown in overtime.
|-
| 
| style="| 
| style="| Packers  16–9
| style="| Packers  21–17
| Bears  66–53–6
|
|-
| 
| colspan="3"| No games
| Bears  66–53–6
| Both games cancelled as a result of the players strike reducing the season to 9 games.
|-
| 
| Tie 1–1
| style="| Bears  23–21
| style="| Packers  31–28
| Bears  67–54–6
| 
|-
| 
| Tie 1–1
| style="| Packers  20–14
| style="| Bears  9–7
| Bears  68–55–6
| 
|-
| 
| style="| 
| style="| Bears  23–7
| style="| Bears  16–10
| Bears  70–55–6 
| Bears win Super Bowl XX.
|-
| 
| style="| 
| style="| Bears  12–10
| style="| Bears  25–12
| Bears  72–55–6 
| 
|-
| 
| style="| 
| style="| Bears  23–10
| style="| Bears  26–24
| Bears  74–55–6 
| 
|-
| 
| style="| 
| style="| Bears  16–0
| style="| Bears  24–6
| Bears  76–55–6 
| Bears win 8 straight meetings (1985–88).
|-
| 
| style="| 
| style="| Packers  40–28
| style="| Packers  14–13
| Bears  76–57–6
| 
|-

|-
| 
| style="| 
| style="| Bears  27–13
| style="| Bears  31–13
| Bears  78–57–6 
| 
|-
| 
| style="| 
| style="| Bears  27–13
| style="| Bears  10–0
| Bears  80–57–6 
| 
|-
| 
| Tie 1–1
| style="| Packers  17–3
| style="| Bears  30–10
| Bears  81–58–6 
| Brett Favre's first season with the Packers. After their win at Lambeau Field, the Bears matched the record for the biggest lead in their overall series with the Packers at 24 games.
|-
| 
| Tie 1–1
| style="| Bears  30–17
| style="| Packers  17–3
| Bears  82–59–6 
| 
|-
| 
| style="| 
| style="| Packers  33–6
| style="| Packers  40–3
| Bears  82–61–6
| Both teams make the playoffs for the first time since .
|-
| 
| style="| 
| style="| Packers  27–24
| style="| Packers  35–28
| Bears  82–63–6
| 
|-
| 
| style="| 
| style="| Packers  37–6
| style="| Packers  28–17
| Bears  82–65–6
| Packers win Super Bowl XXXI.
|-
| 
| style="| 
| style="| Packers  24–23
| style="| Packers  38–24
| Bears  82–67–6
| Packers lose Super Bowl XXXII.
|-
| 
| style="| 
| style="| Packers  16–13
| style="| Packers  26–20
| Bears  82–69–6
| Packers win 10 straight meetings (1994–98).
|-
| 
| Tie 1–1
| style="| Packers  35–19
| style="| Bears  14–13
| Bears  83–70–6 
| 
|-

|-
| 
| Tie 1–1
| style="| Packers  28–6
| style="| Bears  27–24
| Bears  84–71–6 
| 
|-
| 
| style="| 
| style="| Packers  20–12
| style="| Packers  17–7
| Bears  84–73–6
| Bears post a 13–3 season record, with two of their three losses coming to the Packers.
|-
| 
| style="| 
| style="| Packers  34–21
| style="| Packers  30–20
| Bears  84–75–6
| Bears' home game played at Memorial Stadium in Champaign because of renovations being made to Soldier Field.
|-
| 
| style="| 
| style="| Packers  38–23
| style="| Packers  34–21
| Bears  84–77–6
| Packers win 7 straight meetings (2000–03).
|-
| 
| Tie 1–1
| style="| Packers  31–14
| style="| Bears  21–10
| Bears  85–78–6
| Packers win 11 straight away meetings (1994–2004).
|-
| 
| style="| 
| style="| Bears  19–7
| style="| Bears  24–17
| Bears  87–78–6 
| Bears' first season sweep since 1991. Game in Green Bay played on Christmas.
|-
| 
| Tie 1–1
| style="| Packers  26–7
| style="| Bears  26–0
| Bears  88–79–6
| Bears lose Super Bowl XLI.
|-
| 
| style="| 
| style="| Bears  35–7
| style="| Bears  27–20
| Bears  90–79–6 
| In a reversal of the 2001 season, the Packers post a 13–3 record with two of their losses coming to the Bears. Brett Favre's final season in Green Bay. In 32 starts with the Packers, Favre posted a 22–10 record against the Bears. Currently the last time in which the Bears swept the Packers in a season.
|-
| 
| Tie 1–1
| style="| Bears  20–17(OT)
| style="| Packers  37–3
| Bears  91–80–6
| Packers QB Aaron Rodgers' first season as a starter.
|-
| 
| style="| 
| style="| Packers  21–14
| style="| Packers  21–15
| Bears  91–82–6
| 
|-

|-
| 
| Tie 1–1
| style="| Bears  20–17
| style="| Packers  10–3
| Bears  92–83–6
| Packers defeat Bears in Green Bay the final game of the season to clinch a playoff spot. Packers win Super Bowl XLV.
|- style="font-weight:bold;background:#f2f2f2;"
| 2010 Playoffs
| style="| 
| style="| Packers  21–14
|
| Bears  92–84–6
| NFC Championship Game
|-
| 
| style="| 
| style="| Packers  27–17
| style="| Packers  35–21
| Bears  92–86–6
| Game in Green Bay played on Christmas.
|-
| 
| style="| 
| style="| Packers  21–13
| style="| Packers  23–10
| Bears  92–88–6
| 
|-
| 
| Tie 1–1
| style="| Packers  33–28
| style="| Bears  27–20
| Bears  93–89–6
| Bears linebacker Shea McClellin knocks Aaron Rodgers out of the game in Green Bay with a broken collarbone, which sidelines him for seven weeks. Rodgers returns for a win-or-go home contest at Soldier Field in week 17 and delivers the Packers a third consecutive NFC North title with a memorable 48-yard touchdown pass to wide receiver Randall Cobb with 45 seconds left. 
|-
| 
| style="| 
| style="| Packers  38–17
| style="| Packers  55–14 
| Bears  93–91–6
| Aaron Rodgers ties an NFL record with 6 first half touchdown passes in the game in Green Bay.
|-
| 
| Tie 1–1
| style="| Packers  31–23
| style="| Bears  17–13
| Bears  94–92–6
| Game in Green Bay played on Thanksgiving Day. While both teams have played several games on Thanksgiving Day (usually against NFC North rival Detroit), this is the only Thanksgiving Day matchup between the two teams.
|-
| 
| style="| 
| style="| Packers  30–27
| style="| Packers  26–10
| Tie  94–94–6
| 
|-
| 
| style="| 
| style="| Packers  23–16
| style="| Packers  35–14
| Packers  96–94–6
| Packers take their first series lead since 1932. Packers win 8 straight games in Chicago.
|-
| 
| Tie 1–1
| style="| Bears  24–17
| style="| Packers  24–23
| Packers  97–95–6
| Packers come back from 20–3 4th quarter deficit to win the game in Green Bay. With that win, the Packers take their largest ever lead in the all-time series up to that point. Bears win game in Chicago to clinch the NFC North and eliminate the Packers from postseason contention.
|-
| 
| style="| 
| style="| Packers  10–3
| style="| Packers  21–13
| Packers  99–95–6
| Game in Chicago opened the 2019 season. Game in Green Bay marked the 200th game in the rivalry. In a role reversal from 2018, the Packers eliminate the Bears from postseason contention with a 21–13 win in Green Bay.
|-

|-
| 
| style="| 
| style="| Packers  35–16
| style="| Packers  41–25
| Packers  101–95–6
| Game in Green Bay marked the Packers' 100th win in the series. The Packers became the first franchise to record 100 wins over two other franchises, having previously done so against the Detroit Lions. Packers clinch #1 seed in the NFC in their win in Chicago in week 17.
|-
| 
| style="| 
| style="| Packers  24–14
| style="| Packers  45–30
| Packers  103–95–6
| 
|-
| 
| style="| 
| style="| Packers  28–19
| style="| Packers  27–10
| Packers  105–95–6
| After Green Bay's win in Chicago, Green Bay surpassed Chicago as the all-time winningest franchise in the NFL.
|- 

|-
| Regular season
| style="|
| 
| 
| Bears' home record includes 2002 game in Champaign and Packers' home record includes 1974 game in Milwaukee (both of which were Packers wins)
|-
| Postseason
| Tie 1–1
| Tie 1–1
| no games
| 1941 Western Division playoff and 2010 NFC Championship Game
|-
| Regular and postseason 
| style="|
| 
| 
| 
|-

Connections between the two teams

See also
 Brewers–Cubs rivalry

Other rivalries involving the two teams
Bears–Lions rivalry
Bears–Vikings rivalry
Lions–Packers rivalry
Packers–Vikings rivalry

Notes

References

Further reading
 

Chicago Bears
Green Bay Packers rivalries
National Football League rivalries
Sports in the Midwestern United States
Chicago Bears rivalries